Acario Cotapos Baeza (April 30, 1889 - November 22, 1969) was a Chilean composer. He won the National Prize of Art of Chile in 1960.

References

1889 births
1969 deaths
People from Valdivia
Chilean male composers
Members of the International Composers' Guild
20th-century male musicians
Musicians from Valdivia